The Siemens C25 is a mobile phone introduced by Siemens in 1999.Siemens C 25 is positioned as an entry-level model. It is a small, lightweight, handy device. This model was available in only 5 colors (Classic Green, Classic Blue, Anthracite, Bright Blue or Bright Yellow). But it was possible to buy a removable front panel.

There is a function to write your own ringtone. There are several programs for writing melodies. For example, the MIDI-2-C25 allows you to convert MIDI standard music files into a Siemens C25 sheet of notes.

It weighs 135 g and its dimensions are 117 × 47 × 27 mm (length (without the antenna) × width × depth). Its display is a 3 × 12-character monochrome LCD. Display backlight color is green.

The phone's battery powers the phone for 300 minutes talk time, or up to 160 hours if left in stand-by mode.  The Ni MH battery is used as standard. It is a dual-band mobile phone, supporting both GSM 900 and GSM 1800 network frequencies. It supports up to 21 monophonic ringtones. It also supports SMS sending and receiving.

Reviews
Despite usability flaws, Mobile Review found it "a beautiful phone to hold and use". Mobiles magazine scored it 88/100, despite also criticising certain omissions.

References

C25
Mobile phones introduced in 1999